Christopher or Chris Mayer may refer to:
Christopher Mayer (American actor) (1954–2011), American film and TV actor
Christopher Mayer (Australian actor) (born 1961), Australian actor
Christopher J. Mayer (born circa 1965), American economist
Chris Mayer (field hockey) (born 1968), British Olympic field hockey player in 1996
Chris Mayer (musician), Romanian musician and DJ in End-Year Chart 2010 (Romania)

See also
 Christopher Meyer (born 1944), British diplomat